Dieudonné "Dieudo" Minoungou (born June 25, 1981) is a Burkinabé former professional footballer who played as a striker.

Club career
Minoungou was born in Tenkodogo. After the African Nations Cup Finals, he was transferred to Stade Brest 29 and one season later to FC Rouen.

International career
He was a member of the Burkinabé 2004 African Nations Cup team, who finished bottom of their group in the first round of competition, thus failing to secure qualification for the quarter-finals. He was the only scorer.

References

External links

Living people
1981 births
People from Centre-Est Region
Association football forwards
Burkinabé footballers
Burkinabé expatriate footballers
Santos FC Ouagadougou footballers
Grenoble Foot 38 players
Stade Brestois 29 players
Tours FC players
FC Rouen players
FC Ryukyu players
Expatriate footballers in France
Expatriate footballers in Japan
Burkinabé expatriate sportspeople in France
2004 African Cup of Nations players
Burkina Faso international footballers
21st-century Burkinabé people